The Journal of Chromatography B is a peer-reviewed scientific journal publishing research papers in analytical chemistry, with a focus on chromatography techniques and methods in the biological and life sciences. According to the Journal Citation Reports, 'Journal of Chromatography B'' has a 2020 impact factor of 3.205, ranking it 36th out of 83 in the category of Chemistry, Analytical.

See also 
 Journal of Chromatography A

References 

Publications established in 1958
Elsevier academic journals
Chemistry journals